The 1967 SCCA Grand Prix Championship season was the inaugural season of the Sports Car Club of America's championship series for open-wheel, single-seat formula cars, later to be known as the SCCA Continental Championship. The 1967 championship was open to SCCA Formula A, Formula B and Formula C cars, which were limited to a maximum engine displacement of 3.0 liters, 1.6 liters and 1.1 liters respectively. 

In June 1967 the SCCA decreed that, from 1 January 1968,  cars powered by production-based engines of up to 5 litre (305 cubic inch) displacement would be eligible to compete in Formula A and thus for the championship.

Race results
The 1967 SCCA Grand Prix Championship was contested over a five race series.

Points system
Championship points were awarded to drivers on a 9-6-4-3-2-1 basis.

Championship results
The top ten placed drivers in the 1967 championship were as follows:

References

External links
 US Formula B 1967, www.oldracingcars.com

SCCA Grand Prix Championship
SCCA Continental Championship
Formula A (SCCA)